Tarocin A and tarocin B are two structurally unrelated compounds that inhibit the TarO enzyme involved in teichoic acid biosynthesis in bacteria.

Using either of them with β-lactam antibiotics seems to be effective in mice against some β-lactam-resistant bacteria.

Because the tarocins lack activity when used alone it may simplify the clinical trials for approval for medical use.

References

Further reading
 
 

Antibiotics